The 1994 San Jose Open was a men's tennis tournament in San Jose, California, in the United States and was part of the World Series of the 1994 ATP Tour. It was the 106th edition of tournament and was held from January 31 through February 7, 1994. The competition switched location from San Francisco, where it had been held for 21 years. Sixth-seeded Renzo Furlan won the singles title.

Finals

Singles

 Renzo Furlan defeated  Michael Chang, 3–6, 6–3, 7–5
It was Furlan's first career title.

Doubles

 Rick Leach /  Jared Palmer defeated  Byron Black /  Jonathan Stark, 4–6, 6–4, 6–4

References

San Jose Open
SAP Open
Pacific Coast International Open
Pacific Coast International Open
San Jose Open
San Jose Open